Husum station is in Husum in the German state of Schleswig-Holstein. It was built in 1910 and is currently operated by Deutsche Bahn, which classifies it as a category 3 station. A less prestigious predecessor (built in 1854 and demolished in 1910) was located at the northern end of the station, another station (Husum Nord) is to the north of the current main station.

Importance 
The station is a railway hub, connecting the Westerland–Hamburg line (Marsh Railway) with the route to Husum–Bad St. Peter-Ording line on the Eiderstedt peninsula and the Husum–Jübek line, which connects to the Neumünster–Flensburg line and Kiel.

Operations 
All lines are now operated by the Nord-Ostsee-Bahn (NOB) service (now a subsidiary of Veolia Verkehr).However, some InterCity trains are operated by Deutsche Bahn.

Platforms 
The station has several platform tracks, but only four of them have a platform that is in use. Trains leave as follows:
 Platform track 1: regional trains to and from Kiel
 Platform track 3: regional trains to and from Bad St. Peter-Ording, regional trains to and from Kiel
 Platform track 4: long distance and Regional trains to Westerland
 Platform track 5: long distance and  regional trains to Hamburg, regional trains to and from Bad St. Peter-Ording

All these services stop in Husum about every 30 minutes.

The two central platforms are 76 cm high. The platform on tracks 4 and 5 is 430 metres long, the one on tracks 1-3 is 360 metres long.

Notes

External links 

Railway stations in Schleswig-Holstein
Railway stations in Germany opened in 1854
Buildings and structures in Nordfriesland